Sun Zehao (born 13 December 1995) is a Chinese professional ice hockey goaltender who currently plays for Kunlun Red Star in the Kontinental Hockey League (KHL).

Playing career
Sun Zehao began his career playing for Beijing Ice Hockey, in the Chinese Ice Hockey League in 2011. In 2013, he played one game for  China Dragon in the Asia League. In 2014, he returned to the Chinese league with the amateur team from Chengde.  Prior to the beginning of the 2017–18 season, Sun was signed to an amateur tryout contract with the Vancouver Canucks for two pre-season games in China.  The Canucks did not wish to bring a 3rd goalie who would not see action, so they invited Sun to practice with them and be ready to be the back-up goalie in case of injury.

International play
Sun took part in the 2013 IIHF World U18 Championship Division III with China, when he was voted the best goaltender of the tournament, and at the 2015 IIHF World U20 Championship Division III. He also played with the Chinese student team at the 2015 Winter Universiade in Granada, Spain.

Sun first dressed for the men's team at the 2016 IIHF World Championship Division II as the backup goaltender. In 2017, he took over as the starter playing all five games for China. In addition, he represented his country at the 2017 Asian Winter Games in Sapporo, Japan.

References

External links

1995 births
China Dragon players
Chinese ice hockey goaltenders
HC Kunlun Red Star players
Ice hockey players at the 2017 Asian Winter Games
KRS-BSU players
KRS Heilongjiang players
Living people
Sportspeople from Harbin